William Elvy Melville (1902–1981) was an Australian rugby league footballer from the 1920s.

Bill Melville was graded at Glebe from the Darlington junior rugby league club in 1926. He played two first grade seasons with Glebe before retiring, playing in the forward pack with the great Frank Burge. 

Bill Melville was the father of the premiership winning St. George forward Harry Meville from the 1950s. He was also a member of the AIF during World War II.

Bill Melville died at Mascot, New South Wales on 15 Jan 1981 age 79.

References

Glebe rugby league players
Australian rugby league players
1902 births
1981 deaths
Australian military personnel of World War II
Rugby league players from Sydney
Rugby league second-rows